Margaret Lu (born March 21, 1994) is an American fencer.

Lu has participated in the World Fencing Championships several times, winning a silver medal in 2017 and a gold medal in 2018, both in the team events.

She won gold medals at the Pan American Fencing Championships in 2013, 2015, 2017 and 2018, all of which were in the team events. She won bronze medals in the individual events in 2013 and 2017.

She fenced for the Columbia Lions fencing team.  Lu graduated from Columbia University in 2017.

References

1994 births
Living people
American female foil fencers
Sportspeople from Greenwich, Connecticut
Columbia Lions fencers
World Fencing Championships medalists
21st-century American women